O Yun-gyeom (1559–1636) was a scholar-official and Chief State Councillor of the Joseon Dynasty Korea.

He was also diplomat and ambassador, representing Joseon interests in the 2nd Edo period diplomatic mission to the Tokugawa shogunate in Japan.

1617 mission to Japan
O Yun-gyeom was the leader selected by the Gwanghaegun of Joseon to head a mission to Japan in 1617.  The diplomatic mission functioned to the advantage of both the Japanese and the Koreans as a channel for developing a political foundation for trade.

This delegation was explicitly identified by the Joseon court as a "Reply and Prisoner Repatriation Envoy" (회답겸쇄환사, 回答兼刷還使). The mission was not understood to signify that relations were "normalized."

The Joseon monarch's ambassador and retinue traveled only as far as Kyoto, where the delegation was received by Shōgun Hidetada at Fushimi Castle.

See also
 Yeonguijeong
 Joseon diplomacy
 Joseon missions to Japan
 Joseon tongsinsa

Notes

References

 Daehwan, Noh.  "The Eclectic Development of Neo-Confucianism and Statecraft from the 18th to the 19th Century", Korea Journal (Winter 2003).
 Lewis, James Bryant. (2003). Frontier contact between chosŏn Korea and Tokugawa Japan. London: Routledge. 
 Toby, Ronald P. (1991).  State and Diplomacy in Early Modern Japan: Asia in the Development of the Tokugawa Bakufu. Stanford: Stanford University Press. 
 Walker, Brett L.  "Foreign Affairs and Frontiers in Early Modern Japan: A Historiographical Essay", Early Modern Japan. Fall, 2002, pp. 44–62, 124–128.
 Walraven, Boudewijn and Remco E. Breuker. (2007). Korea in the Middle: Korean Studies and Area Studies; Essays in Honour of Boudewijn Walraven. Leiden: CNWS Publications. ;

External links
 O Yun-gyeom at Encyclopedia of Korean Culture 
 Joseon Tongsinsa Cultural Exchange Association ; 
조선통신사연구 (Journal of Studies in Joseon Tongsinsa) 

1559 births
1636 deaths
17th-century Korean people
Korean diplomats
Haeju Oh clan